The 1959 Copa del Generalísimo Juvenil was the ninth staging of the tournament. The competition began on March 1, 1959, and ended on June 29, 1959, with the final.

First round

|}

Second round

|}

Quarterfinals

|}

Semifinals

|}

Final

|}

Copa del Rey Juvenil de Fútbol
Juvenil